Gábocs Kocsis (born 30 November 1985) is a Hungarian football player who currently plays for Dunaújváros PASE.

References
MLSZ
HLSZ

1985 births
Living people
People from Kiskunhalas
Hungarian footballers
Association football midfielders
Dunaújváros FC players
Fehérvár FC players
FC Felcsút players
BFC Siófok players
Vasas SC players
Dunaújváros PASE players
Nemzeti Bajnokság I players
Sportspeople from Bács-Kiskun County